The 1996 Copa del Rey was the 60th edition of the Spanish basketball Cup. It was organized by the ACB and was played in Murcia in the Palacio de Deportes between February 22 and 25, 1996. TDK Manresa won its first title after defeating FC Barcelona in the overtime of the final game.

Bracket

Final
A three-point shoot at the buzzer of Joan Creus allowed TDK Manresa to win its first title ever.

MVP of the Tournament: Joan Creus

References

External links
Boxscores at ACB.com 
Linguasport

Copa del Rey de Baloncesto
1995–96 in Spanish basketball